Zantu Givestin N'Suki (born 24 July 1990) is an Angolan professional footballer who plays as a striker.  who currently plays for Hebei Zhongji in the China League One.

Club career
On 31 July 2014, N'Suki transferred to China League One side Hebei Zhongji.

References

External links

1990 births
Living people
Angolan footballers
Angolan expatriate footballers
Serie B players
China League One players
S.S. Juve Stabia players
A.S.D. Sorrento players
Hebei F.C. players
Expatriate footballers in Italy
Expatriate footballers in China
Association football forwards